Muccino is an Italian surname. Notable people with the surname include: 

Gabriele Muccino (born 1967), Italian film director
Silvio Muccino (born 1982), Italian actor, film director and screenwriter

Italian-language surnames